The 1980–81 FA Trophy was the twelfth season of the FA Trophy.

Preliminary round

Ties

Replays

First qualifying round

Ties

Replays

Second qualifying round

Ties

Replays

2nd replay

3rd replay

4th replay

5th Replay

6th Replay

Third qualifying round

Ties

Replays

1st round
The teams that given byes to this round are Dagenham, Altrincham, Weymouth, Worcester City, Boston United, Gravesend & Northfleet, Maidstone United, Kettering Town, Bangor City, Nuneaton Borough, Yeovil Town, Barrow, Stafford Rangers, Matlock Town, Bedford Town, Runcorn, Enfield, Wycombe Wanderers, Leatherhead, Tooting & Mitcham United, Spennymoor United, Marine, Blyth Spartans, Cheltenham Town, Mossley, Barking, Chorley, Walthamstow Avenue, Dulwich Hamlet, Sutton United, Woking and Ashington.

Ties

Replays

2nd replay

2nd round

Ties

Replays

3rd round

Ties

Replays

2nd replay

4th round

Ties

Replay

Semi finals

First leg

Second leg

Final

References

General
 Football Club History Database: FA Trophy 1980–81

Specific

1980–81 domestic association football cups
League
1980-81